Prime is a surname found primarily in the United Kingdom and its former colonies.

People
 Anita Prime, New Zealand singer-songwriter
 Audrey Prime (1915–2001), British trade unionist
 Barry Prime (born 1954), British swimmer
 Benjamin Prime (1733–1791), American poet, essayist, and songwriter
 Dalvanius Prime (1948–2002), New Zealand entertainer and songwriter
 Geoffrey Prime (born 1938), British spy
 George Prime (born 1953), politician from the island of Grenada
 Harry Prime (1920–2017), American singer
 James Prime (born 1960), Scottish musician
 Jimmy Prime (born 1993), Canadian rapper
 John Prime (died 1596), English clergyman
 Justin Prime (born 1986), Dutch DJ
 Leopold Prime (1884–1923), New Zealand cricketer
 Nathaniel Prime (1768–1840), American broker and banker
 Nathaniel Prime (naval officer), American officer during the Civil War
 Samuel I. Prime (1812–1885), American clergyman, traveller, and writer
 Spencer G. Prime (1851–1926), New York politician
 Temple Prime (1832-1903), amateur conchologist and genealogist

Fictional 

 Optimus Prime, from the Transformers franchise

See also 
 Prime (disambiguation)

English-language surnames